Norbert Gombos was the defending champion but lost in the second round to Lukáš Rosol.

Adam Pavlásek won the title after defeating Stéphane Robert 6–4, 3–6, 6–3 in the final.

Seeds

Draw

Finals

Top half

Bottom half

References
 Main Draw
 Qualifying Draw

Sparta Prague Open - Singles
2016 Singles